Slanted Publishers is an independent German publisher. The publishing house is based in Karlsruhe and was founded in 2014 by Lars Harmsen and Julia Kahl. It publishes Slanted, the magazine for typography, and other publications dealing with contemporary art, illustration, design, photography, and typography.

Magazine Slanted 
Slanted Publishers publishes the biannual print magazine Slanted. The magazine was founded in 2005. It focuses on international design and cultural creation. Each issue is dedicated to a specific typographical or country-specific topic with an appropriately designed layout. The editorial office is located in Karlsruhe. As of May 2020, 35 issues of the magazine were published (excluding special editions), each of which is dedicated to a specific typographic or location-related topic. Between 2013 and 2020 four special issues have been published.

The magazine has won awards in national and international design competitions. Among others it received the Designpreis der Bundesrepublik Deutschland (Design Award of the Federal Republic of Germany) (Silver, 2009) and the German Design Award 2018.

Website Slanted.de 
The publishing house operates the website Slanted.de. Since 2004, daily news and events from the fields of design, typography, illustration, and photography of the international design scene have been published here. Portfolios from all over the world are presented.

The website has more than 180 video interviews with design personalities as contemporary witnesses as of 2020, including Milton Glaser, Steven Heller, Louise Fili, Lance Wyman, Michael Bierut, Niklaus Troxler, and Wolfgang Weingart.

The blog was ranked among the 100 most important German-language corporate blogs in 2008 and received the gold medal in the category “Weblog of the Year” at the LeadAwards 2008.

Publications 

 Slanted Publishers, Nigel Cottier, Letterform Variations, 2021-11, 
 Slanted Publishers, Film Festival Cologne—Die Macht der Bilder, 2021-10, 
 Slanted Publishers, Dr. Martin Lorenz, Flexible Visual Systems, 2021-10, 
 Slanted Publishers, Emanuele Sferruzza Moszkowicz, Il Teatro è Il Teatro è Il Teatro, 2021-10, 
 Slanted Publishers, Volker Derlath, Oktoberfest 1984–2019, 2021-09, 
 Slanted Publishers, 100 Poster Battle 2020–2021, 2021-09, 
 Slanted Publishers, Clara Hoppe, INSTANT NUDES, 2021-08, 
 Slanted Publishers, Kevin Halpin, Please Come: Shameless/Limitless—Selected Posters & Texts 2008–2020, 2021-06, 
 Slanted Publishers, Büro Destruct, Büro Destruct 4—By Büro Destruct, 2021-06, 
 Slanted Publishers, Jeremiah Chiu, Jeremiah Chiu – Ou(te)r Space, 2021-06, 
 Slanted Publishers, Yearbook of Type 2021 / 22, 2021-04, 
 Slanted Publishers, Florian Budke, Ar/Kate Mannheim, 2021-04, 
 Slanted Publishers, Cihan Tamti, Cihan Tamti — Breakout–100 Posters Book, 
 Slanted Publishers, Juliane Nöst, Teasing Typography, 2021-03, 
 Slanted Publishers, Roman Klonek, Woodcut Vibes, 2021-02, 
 Slanted Publishers, Marian Misiak, Lars Harmsen, Support Independent Type—the New Culture of Type Specimens, 2020-12, 
 Slanted Publishers, Eliana Berger, Kurt Bille, Lara von Richthofen, Lena Kronenbürger, fortytwomagazine #5—space, 2020-12, 
 Slanted Publishers, Christian Beck, Tea Trip – eine faszinierende Reise durch das Reich der Mitte, 2020-12, 
 Slanted Publishers, Benjamin Wurster, Leafy House Plants, 2020-11, 
 Slanted Publishers, Rubén Sánchez, Today is Tomorrow’s Yesterday, 2020-10, 
 Slanted Publishers, Paula Riek, Questions to Europe (En) / Fragen an Europa (De), 2020-10,
 Slanted Publishers, Stefan Braun, Monopoli: a fishing village in Apulia, 2020-10, 
 Slanted Publishers, Jannis Maroscheck, Shape Grammars, 2020-07, 
 Slanted Publishers, Slanted Special Issue Rhineland-Palatinate, 2020-07, 
Slanted Publishers, Maviblau, Şimdi heißt jetzt, 2020-04, 
 Slanted Publishers, Markus Lange, Karl-Heinz Drescher—Berlin Typo Posters, Texts, and Interviews, 2020-02, 
 Slanted Publishers, Dirk Gebhardt, Beneath the veil of Cairo, 2020-01, 
 Slanted Publishers, Kai Jünemann, Will Feel Eyes on, 2019-12, 
 Slanted Publishers, Slanted Special Issue – Rwanda, 2019-08, 
 Slanted Publishers, Marie Schaller, Mara Schneider, Florian Brugger, Lars Harmsen, Melville Brand Design, Studio Markus Lange, Apollo 11–The Eagle Has Landed*, 2019-07, 
 Slanted Publishers, Dirk Gebhard, Play Life—Neighbors in the Western Balkans, 2019-06, 
 Slanted Publishers, Ian Lynam, Total Armageddon—A Slanted Reader on Design, 2019-03, 
 Slanted Publishers, Robert Eysoldt & Raban Ruddigkeit, Berlin Design Digest – 100 successful projects, products, and processes, 2017-04, 
 Slanted Publishers, Dirk Gebhardt, Cuba – 90 años fidel un recuerdo de cuba, 2016-12, 
 Slanted Publishers (Editor), niggli Verlag, Yearbook of Type II, 2015-10, 
 Slanted Publishers (Editor), niggli Verlag, Slanted Publishers, Yearbook of Type I, 2013-06, 
 Slanted Publishers, Slanted Magazine,

Awards 

 ADC Germany: 2021, 2020, 2019, 2014, 2013, 2012, 2010, 2008, 2007
 Berliner Type: 2009, 2008
 DDC Wettbewerb – GUTE GESTALTUNG: 2019
 Designpreis der BRD: 2009
 European Design Awards: 2020, 2012, 2011, 2010, 2008
 iF communication design award: 2007
 German Design Award: 2020, 2018, 2017, 2016
 Lead Awards: 2013, 2008
 Tokyo TDC: 2021, 2017, 2016, 2015
ADC of Europe: 2020

External links 

 Slanted.de by Slanted Publishers - Design-News, Publisher, Shop - slanted. In: slanted.de. (official website).

References 



Publishing companies of Germany